Sebastian Thangmuansang (born 25 July 1998) is an Indian professional footballer who plays as a defender for I-League club Mohammedan, on loan from Indian Super League club Odisha.

Career

Early career
Born in Churachandpur, Manipur, Thangmuansang started playing football at the age of five. In August 2014, he joined the Pune F.C. Academy (soon turned into the Pune City Academy). After spending time with the youth academy, Thangmuansang was loaned to Chennai City of the I-League.

Thangmuansang made his competitive senior debut for the club on 4 December 2017 against Gokulam Kerala. He started and played the whole 90 minutes as Chennai City drew the match 1–1.

NEROCA
On 17 June 2018, it was announced that Thangmuansang signed for NEROCA in the I-League. He made his debut for the club on 7 November 2018 in a league match against Aizawl. He started the match and earned a yellow card in the 88th minute as NEROCA drew 0–0.

Gokulam Kerala
On 1 August 2019, it was announced that Sebastian signed for Gokulam Kerala FC. He was  part of Gokulam Kerala's 2019 Durand Cup winning squad  and 2020–21 I-League title winning squad.

Odisha
On 14 May 2021, Sebastian joined Indian Super League club Odisha FC on a two-year contract.

Career statistics

Honours

Club
Gokulam Kerala

 Durand Cup: 2019
 I-League: 2020–21

References

1998 births
Living people
People from Churachandpur district
Indian footballers
Pune FC players
FC Pune City players
Chennai City FC players
NEROCA FC players
Association football midfielders
Footballers from Manipur
I-League players
Indian Super League players
Gokulam Kerala FC players
Odisha FC players